Owlchemy Labs is a video game developer based in Austin, Texas. The company was founded in 2010 by Worcester Polytechnic Institute graduate Alex Schwartz. Owlchemy is best known for its virtual reality video games Job Simulator and Rick and Morty: Virtual Rick-ality. In May 2017, the studio was acquired by Google.

Owlchemy also founded VR Austin, one of the largest VR-focused meetups in the US with over 2000 members, which holds Austin based VR Meetings and hosts a yearly game jam. Before that, the founders started the Boston Unity Group and the Winnipeg Unity User Group.

Alex Schwartz departed the company on July 18, 2018; former CTO Devin Reimer became CEO, and Andrew Eiche became CTO.

Awards and accolades
Job Simulator went platinum in January 2020.
Job Simulator won the Game Developer's Choice Award for best VR/AR Game in 2017.

Games developed

 Super Ramen BROTHers – iOS (2010)
 AaaaaAAaaaAAAaaAAAAa!!! for the Awesome (with Dejobaan Games) – Windows (2011)
 Smuggle Truck – Windows, Mac OS X (2011)
 Snuggle Truck – iOS (2011), Nokia N9, BlackBerry PlayBook, Windows (2012)
 Jack Lumber – Windows, Mac OS X, Linux (2013)
 Dyscourse – Windows, Mac OS X, Linux (2015)
 Job Simulator – Windows, PlayStation 4 (2016), Oculus Quest (May 21, 2019)
 Rick and Morty: Virtual Rick-ality – Windows (HTC Vive, Oculus Rift), PlayStation VR (2017)
 Vacation Simulator – Windows (HTC Vive, Oculus Rift) (released April 9, 2019), PlayStation VR (released June 18, 2019), Oculus Quest (December 12, 2019)
 Cosmonious High – Windows (HTC Vive, Oculus Rift, Steam VR), Oculus Quest, Oculus Quest 2 (March 31, 2022)

References

External links
 
 

Google acquisitions
2010 establishments in the United States
Video game companies of the United States